The Cuba Democracy Caucus is a bicameral and bi-partisan congressional group that was created in 2004 with the stated purpose of "promoting discussion and proactive policies designed to hasten Cuba's transition towards a free and democratic society."

Members 
Senator Bob Menendez (D-NJ)
Representative Mario Díaz-Balart (R-FL)
Representative Patrick McHenry (R-NC)
Representative Frank Pallone (D-NJ)
Representative Albio Sires (D-NJ)
Representative Christopher Smith (R-NJ)
Representative Debbie Wasserman Schultz (D-FL)

See also

 Cuban-American lobby
Congressional Venezuela Democracy Caucus

External links
 Battle over Cuba policy heats up

Cuban Democracy
Cuba–United States relations
Opposition to Fidel Castro
Foreign policy political advocacy groups in the United States